Escobaria sneedii (syn. Coryphantha sneedii) is a rare species of cactus known by the common names Sneed's pincushion cactus and carpet foxtail cactus. It is native to the Chihuahuan Desert, where it occurs in scattered locations in New Mexico, Texas, and Chihuahua. Some plants occurring in Arizona may be included within this species. Botanical authors do not necessarily agree on the circumscription of this species. Most will agree at this point in the research, however, that there are two varieties of Escobaria sneedii, and that both are rare and endangered. The plant is popular with cactus enthusiasts and dealers because of its often petite size and tolerance for moderately cold climates. They have been overharvested from their natural habitat, the main reason why the two varieties, var. sneedii and var. leei, have been federally listed as endangered and threatened, respectively.

This is a small cactus growing up to about 27 centimeters tall, but sometimes revealing just a few centimeters above ground level, the rest of the stem buried. The species may branch profusely, even when small and immature. It is coated densely in patches of bright white spines; each patch may have nearly 100. Depending on the substrate, the spines may be tinted with yellow, pink, purple, or brown. They may have dark tips and as the cactus ages the spines darken to gray and even black. The shape of the spines separates the varieties: var. sneedii has straight spines that spread from the areole and var. leei has curved spines. The cactus blooms in spring, bearing flowers 1 to 3 centimeters long near the top of its body. The flower is variable in color. It can be bright to pale pink, white to off-white, greenish, or brownish in color. Each tepal may have a darker midstripe of most any color. The fruit is generally either red or green, usually tinged with other colors, and may be up to 2 centimeters long.

This cactus, particularly var. sneedii was heavily collected for the cactus trade starting in the 1920s when it was discovered. The var. leei also faced this threat. There was no need for this poaching, because the plant is easily propagated in the garden. Most authors believe that var. leei is a New Mexico endemic that only grows in Carlsbad Caverns National Park, and any E. sneedii outside the park are var. sneedii. Threats to the species outside the national park include habitat loss. One example is the loss of a population of var. sneedii that occurred when a road was built connecting Las Cruces, New Mexico, and El Paso, Texas.

A cactus described in the 1980s, Escobaria guadalupensis, is sometimes included within this species. If it is not, then it appears to hybridize with it at times.

References

External links

USDA Plants Profile
Photo gallery: var. sneedii and var. leei

sneedii
Flora of the Chihuahuan Desert